The Mahoosuc Range, a northern extension of the White Mountains, straddles the border between New Hampshire and Maine. The range's highest peak,  Old Speck Mountain, is the fourth-highest peak in Maine. Substantial parts of the range are publicly owned as parts of the National Park Service Appalachian Trail corridor and Grafton Notch State Park in Maine.

The Appalachian Trail traverses the main ridge of the Mahoosucs between Shelburne, New Hampshire and Grafton Notch in Maine. Mahoosuc Notch, considered one of the most difficult sections of the Appalachian Trail, cuts a deep cleft in the middle of the range between Mahoosuc Mountain and Fulling Mill Mountain.

Mountains 
(from north to south)
 Old Speck Mountain 4,170 ft
 Mahoosuc Arm 3,790 ft
 Mahoosuc Mountain 3,490 ft
 Fulling Mill Mountain 3,450 ft
 Goose Eye Mountain, West Pk. 3,870 ft
 Goose Eye, North Pk. 3,650 ft
 Goose Eye, East Pk. 3,794 ft
 Mount Carlo 3,565 ft
 Mount Success 3,565 ft
 North Bald Cap 2,893 ft
 Bald Cap 3,065 ft
 Bald Cap Peak 2,785 ft
 Cascade Mountain 2,631 ft
 Mount Hayes 2,555 ft

See also
 White Mountains (New Hampshire)
 Vegetation of New England and the Maritime Provinces

References
Appalachian Mountain Club

External links 
 
  PeakBagger.com: Mahoosuc Range
  summitpost.org: Mahoosuc Range

Mountain ranges of New Hampshire
Mountain ranges of Maine
White Mountains (New Hampshire)
Landforms of Oxford County, Maine
Landforms of Coös County, New Hampshire